Zonar may refer to:
 Joannes Zonaras
 Zonar, Iran
 Zonar, an electronic fleet-management software program